The Mirny Station (literally Peaceful) is a Russian (formerly Soviet) first Antarctic science station located in Queen Mary Land, Antarctica,  on the Antarctic coast of the Davis Sea.

The station is managed by the Arctic and Antarctic Research Institute and was named after the support vessel Mirny captained by Mikhail Lazarev during the First Russian Antarctic Expedition, led by Fabian Gottlieb von Bellingshausen on Vostok.

Mirny Station was damaged by a fire on Sunday 21 June 2020.

Purpose and facilities
The station was opened on February 13, 1956, by the 1st Soviet Antarctic Expedition. In summer, it hosts up to 50 people in 30 buildings, in winter about 40-50 scientists and technicians.

Main areas of research are glaciology, seismology, meteorology, observation of polar lights, cosmic radiation, and marine biology.

Historic monuments

It was erected on a sledge on the land transport route between coastal Mirny and inland Vostok Station. It commemorates Anatoly Shcheglov, a driver-mechanic who died while performing his duties. It has been designated a Historic Site or Monument (HSM 8) following a proposal by Russia to the Antarctic Treaty Consultative Meeting.

Climate

Mirny Station has an ice cap climate, since all months are below . Although, it is heavily influenced by the glacial nature of Antarctica's interior, it retains a strong maritime influence, resulting in high annual snowfall. Summers however, are sunny and dry, reflecting a mediterranean precipitation pattern, in spite of its poleward latitude and cold temperatures. Summer see highs approaching  on average, whereas winters are stable just below  means for several months.

See also
 List of Antarctic research stations
 List of Antarctic field camps

References

External links
 AARI Mirny Station page
 Official website Arctic and Antarctic Research Institute
 COMNAP Antarctic Facilities
 COMNAP Antarctic Facilities Map

1956 establishments in Antarctica
Outposts of Antarctica
Russia and the Antarctic
Soviet Union and the Antarctic
Outposts of Queen Mary Land